The tribunal system of Sri Lanka is part of the national system of administrative justice.

List of tribunals

Religious tribunals
 Buddhist religious councils - tribunals hearing disciplinary matters pertaining to Buddhist clergy, beyond the purview of the Buddhist Temporalities Ordinance of 1931
 Kathi Court - special tribunal that adjudicates on matrimonial matters relating to Muslims

Administrative tribunals
 Mediation Boards - under the Mediation Boards Act No. 72 of 1988

Employment
 Labour Tribunals
 Labor Tribunals under the Wages Board Ordinance
 The Workmen’s Compensation Tribunals
 Board of Appeal under the Factories Ordinance

Finance
 Inland Revenue Board of Appeal

Housing
 Ceiling on Housing Property Board of Review
 Rent Board of Review
 Rent Boards

Land and agriculture
 Tribunals under Agricultural Productivity Law
 Land Acquisition Board of Review
 Agricultural Tribunals

Family
 Quazis and Boards of Quazis

See also
 List of tribunals in the United Kingdom
 Federal tribunals in the United States

References

Sri Lankan administrative law